Alian (also Romanized as ‘Alīān, Alīyān, and ‘Alyan) is a village in Qohab-e Rastaq Rural District, Amirabad District, Damghan County, Semnan Province, Iran. At the 2006 census, its population was 105, in 41 families.

References 

Populated places in Damghan County